Chae Ho-ki (Hangul: 채호기) is a modern South Korean poet.

Life
Chae Ho-ki was born on October 13, 1957 in Daegu, South Korea and published his first poem in 1988 and since that time has been considered by South Korean critics as one of the major voices in Korean literature.

Work

If a desire for emotional union with the subject matter can be described as a general characteristic of Korean poetry, Chae departs radically from such a tendency to seek instead the complete obliteration of the boundary between the subject and the language in his poetry. His first volume of poetry, Ferocious Love, rejects love as an idea and an emotional state and focuses on its physicality and mortality: 

Desire itself is objectified and given a physicality in "The Sad Gay", in which a gay man transforms himself into another being through the mechanical process of replacing body parts: 

Chae's  most successful attempt to create a oneness with another is judged to be his Water Lilies. In this volume of poetry, language acts as a corrosive agent that melts away the external shape of things to reveal their true essence by means of which a perfect union with others is achieved.

Works in Korean (partial)
Poetry collections
 Ferocious Love (Jidokhan sarang, 1992)
 The Sad Gay (Seulpen gaei, 1994)
 A Telephone of the Night (Bamui gongjung jeonhwa, 1997)
 Water Lilies (Suryeon, 2002)

Awards
 2002 Kim Su-yeong Literature Prize (Established since 1981 in honor of Kim Soo-young) (2002), for Water Lilies
 2007 올해의 출판인상 Award
 2007 National Contemporary Poetry Award

References 

1957 births
20th-century South Korean poets
Living people
21st-century South Korean poets
South Korean male poets
20th-century male writers
21st-century male writers